The Burundian genocide may refer to:

 the Ikiza – the 1972 mass killings of Hutus
 the 1993 ethnic violence in Burundi against Tutsis